Michael John Gilmour Howlett (born 27 April 1950) is a bass guitar player, record producer and teacher based in the United Kingdom and Australia.

Career
In the late 1960s, Howlett was the bassist in Sydney pop band the Affair, which included vocalist Kerrie Biddell. The group travelled to England after winning a prize in the Hoadley's Battle of the Sounds band competition. Howlett settled in London and in 1973 joined renowned British progressive rock group Gong, which had been founded by an Australian expatriate, Daevid Allen. He remained with Gong until 1977, recording several albums with them and co-writing much of their material later in this period with drummer Pierre Moerlen.

After leaving Gong, Howlett formed the short-lived band Strontium 90, which consisted of himself, Sting, Stewart Copeland and Andy Summers. In addition to being the band's lead bassist and chief songwriter, Howlett performed most of the lead vocals in live performances. The band recorded several demos and played at a Paris Gong reunion concert in May 1977, but disbanded when Summers left to join Copeland and Sting's other project, the Police. An archival collection of Strontium 90 material was released two decades later as Strontium 90: Police Academy.

A few months after the breakup of Strontium 90, Howlett served as bassist for the one-off studio band The Radio Actors, which also included Gong bandmate Steve Hillage on lead guitar and Strontium 90 bandmate Sting (who came to the group by way of Howlett's recommendation) on lead vocals. The band's single, "Nuclear Waste" b/w "Digital Love", was reissued on CD in 1995 with liner notes and three bonus tracks, though none of the bonus tracks involved Howlett.

In the 1980s, Howlett became an in-demand producer, with a string of notable credits. He produced many hit singles and albums for leading new wave music acts including A Flock of Seagulls, the Alarm, China Crisis, Martha and the Muffins, Orchestral Manoeuvres in the Dark, Stephen Duffy, Gang of Four and Comsat Angels. He also produced the album Secret Secrets for Joan Armatrading in 1985.

Gong performs occasional reunion gigs around the world, and Howlett usually joins them. In 1993, he launched a record label, Mauve, which released albums by singer-songwriters Rafa Russo, Debbie Cassell and Jay Fisher. From 2005 to 2009, Howlett was chairman of the Music Producers Guild (MPG).

Howlett was awarded a PhD on the subject of record production in 2009 and has lectured in music technology at several universities, including the University of Glamorgan (now the University of South Wales) in Pontypridd, Wales and Thames Valley University (Ealing, London). In 2009, he became Head of Music at Queensland University of Technology in Brisbane, Australia and is an Adjunct Professor for QUT.

Personal life
Howlett is married with three children and two grandchildren. He lives in West London.

Production credits

Fischer-Z
 Word Salad (1979); Going Deaf for a Living (1980)
Punishment of Luxury
 Laughing Academy (1979)
Martha and the Muffins
 "Insect Love" (1979); Metro Music (1979); "Echo Beach" (1980); Trance and Dance (1980)
The Revillos
 Rev Up (Snatzo/Dindisc, 1980)
The Teardrop Explodes
 "When I Dream" (1980)
Orchestral Manoeuvres in the Dark
 "Messages" (1980); "Enola Gay" (1980); "Souvenir" (1981)
Sniff 'n' the Tears
 Love/Action (1981); Ride Blue Divide (1982)
Thompson Twins
 "Perfect Game" and "Politics" from A Product of ... (1981)
Any Trouble
 Wheels in Motion (Stiff, 1981)
Tears for Fears
 "Pale Shelter" (1982)
Gang of Four
 Songs of the Free (1982)

Blancmange
 Happy Families (1982); "Living on the Ceiling" (1982)
A Flock of Seagulls
 A Flock of Seagulls (1982); Listen (1983)
Hunters & Collectors
 Hunters & Collectors (1982); Payload (EP, 1982)
The Comsat Angels
 Land (1983); 7 Day Weekend (1985, not all songs)
China Crisis
 Working with Fire and Steel – Possible Pop Songs Volume Two (1983)
John Foxx
 "Twilight's Last Gleaming" from The Golden Section (1983)
Berlin
 Love Life (1984, not all songs)
Joan Armatrading
 Secret Secrets (1985)
The Alarm
 Strength (1985)
The Ward Brothers
 Madness of It All (1986, not all songs)
TV21
 All Join Hands (1982)

References

External links
Official website
1997 interview on Calyx: the Canterbury website
Biography on Calyx: the Canterbury website

1950 births
Living people
Academics of the University of West London
Fijian people of British descent
Academic staff of Queensland University of Technology
Alumni of the University of Glamorgan
Fijian record producers
British music educators
British record producers
The Police
People from Lautoka
Fijian emigrants to Australia
Fijian musicians
Gong (band) members
Strontium 90 (band) members
The Affair (band) members
Male bass guitarists
Progressive rock bass guitarists